Valence-d'Agen is a railway station in Valence, Tarn-et-Garonne, Occitanie, France. The station is on the Bordeaux–Sète railway. The station is served by TER (local) services operated by SNCF.

Train services
The following services currently call at Valence-d'Agen:
local service (TER Occitanie) Agen – Montauban – Toulouse

References

External links

Railway stations in Tarn-et-Garonne